Gerasimovich may refer to:
 Boris Gerasimovich
 2126 Gerasimovich
 Gerasimovich (crater)